The Stotts Island Nature Reserve is a protected nature reserve containing the Stotts Island, a river island, that is located in the Tweed River, in the Northern Rivers region of New South Wales in eastern Australia.

The island was named after James Stott, an early cedar cutter. Originally an Irish convict, he was sentenced in 1826 to seven years transportation to New South Wales for the theft of clothing.

Features
Stotts Island is composed of alluvium deposited from the Pleistocene to the present. It is prone to flooding, during which times silt and weed material accumulate on the island. The island is continuously being reshaped by erosion.

The reserve contains an intact  segment of lowland sub-tropical rainforest. Most of this rainforest type has been destroyed for agriculture, mining or housing. Stotts Island is declared critical habitat  for the endangered Mitchell's rainforest snail, rediscovered in 1976. The rainforest is particularly tall and impressive. Species of rainforest tree include hoop pine, bangalow palm, tuckeroo, red cedar, giant water gum, hard quandong, cigar cassia and white fig. The endangered red-fruited ebony has been planted in the adjacent Bruce Chick Conservation Park. Its current status on the island is in doubt. It was recorded as a seedling on the island in 1957, the first known live specimen since 1917. Bruce Chick was a local resident who encouraged revegetation of the riverside rainforest.

Weeds that have invaded nearby rainforest include madeira vine (Anredera cordifolia), cat's claw (Macfadyena unguis-cati), moonflower (Ipomoea alba) and lantana (Lantana camara), although the rainforest on the island itself has been little affected to date.

47 species of bird, 6 species of lizard, 3 species of snakes and 3 species of frogs have been recorded on Stotts Island Nature Reserve. Mammal species and populations are poorly known.

See also

 List of islands of New South Wales
 Protected areas of New South Wales

References 

Nature reserves in New South Wales
Northern Rivers
Forests of New South Wales
Islands of New South Wales
1971 establishments in Australia
Protected areas established in 1971